Jaipur Division is one of the administrative geographical unit, called a division,  of Rajasthan state, India. The division comprises five districts, namely, Alwar, Dausa, Jaipur, Jhunjhunu, Sikar.

References

 
Divisions of Rajasthan